The Mayor of Portland, Oregon is the official head of the city of Portland, Oregon, United States. The officeholder is elected for a four-year term and has no term limits. By law, all elections in Portland are nonpartisan. The current mayor is Ted Wheeler, who has served since 2017, and was first elected in the 2016 election.

Duties and powers 
Portland uses a city commission government, the only major city to do so. The mayor and commissioners are responsible for legislative policy and oversee the various bureaus that oversee the day-to-day operation of the city. The mayor serves as chairman of the council, and is responsible for allocating department assignments to his fellow commissioners. His post is largely honorific; most powers exercised by mayors in cities of Portland's size are vested in the council as a whole. However, the mayor does have some powers, such as declaring an emergency and acting as police commissioner.

Elections 
The mayor is elected in citywide election. Elections follow a two-round system. The first round of the election is called the primary election. The candidate receiving a majority of the vote in the primary is elected outright. If no candidate receives a majority, the top two candidates advance to a runoff election, called the general election. The City Charter also allows for write-in candidates. The mayor is elected to a four-year term with no term limits. The office of Mayor is officially nonpartisan by state law, although most mayoral candidates identify a party preference. Mayoral elections happen in conjunction with the United States presidential election.

The most recent election was the 2020 election, when incumbent Ted Wheeler was re-elected in the November runoff.

List of mayors

See also 

 List of mayors of Portland, Oregon
 Government of Portland, Oregon
 History of Portland, Oregon

References 

Government of Portland, Oregon